Stanway Rovers Football Club is a football club based in Stanway, near Colchester, in Essex, England.

History
The modern club was established on 10 July 1956, although records show that another club by the same name had been playing in the early 1900s, including winning Division II B of the Essex & Suffolk Border League in 1927–28. The new club joined Division Two of the Colchester and East Essex League, and by 1960 had reached the Premier Division. They won the Premier Division in 1967–68 and again in 1973–74. The following season saw them reach the final of the Essex Junior Cup, where they lost 1–0 to Takeley.

In 1975 Stanway joined Division One of the Essex & Suffolk Border League, and in 1978 were placed in the new Division Two. The 1978–79 season saw the club finish third and win promotion to Division One. They were later relegated to Division Two, which they won in 1981–82 and again in 1985–86 after another relegation. However, in 1986–87 the club won Division One, and were promoted to the Premier Division. In 1990 and 1991 the club reached the final of the Essex Intermediate Cup, but lost both matches 3–1. In 1991–92 they were Premier Division runners-up, and were promoted to Division One of the Eastern Counties League. In 2005–06 the club won Division One, and were promoted to the Premier Division. They went on to win the League Cup in 2008–09, beating Leiston 4–2 on penalties in the final. They won the cup again in 2011–12 with a 2–1 win over Norwich United in the final.

At the end of the 2017–18 season, Stanway were transferred to the Essex Senior League. However, after a single season in the Essex Senior League, they were moved back to the Eastern Counties League Premier Division. They were transferred back to the Essex Senior League in 2021.

Ground
The club was initially based at the King George V playing fields in Lexden, more commonly known as Clairmont Road, before moving to Stanway Secondary School in 1961. In 1979 the club agreed a 99-year lease with the local council for a  plot of land. On 18 November 1982 the new clubhouse was opened, and named "Hawthorns".

Honours
Eastern Counties League
Division One champions 2005–06
League Cup winners 2008–09, 2011–12
Essex & Suffolk Border League
Division One champions 1986–87
Division Two champions 1981–82, 1985–86
Colchester & East Essex League
Premier Division champions 1973–74

Records
Best FA Cup performance: Second qualifying round 2008–09, 2015–16
Best FA Vase performance: Fifth round, 2007–08, 2014–15
Record attendance: 575 vs Saffron Walden Town, FA Vase fourth round, 17 January 2015

See also
Stanway Rovers F.C. players
Stanway Rovers F.C. managers

References

External links
Official website

 
Football clubs in England
Football clubs in Essex
Association football clubs established in 1956
1956 establishments in England
Borough of Colchester
Colchester and East Essex Football League
Essex and Suffolk Border Football League
Eastern Counties Football League
Essex Senior Football League